Creative Atlantic Communications is a Canadian television production company based in Halifax, Nova Scotia.

History
Creative Atlantic was established in 1989 by Greg Jones and Janice Evans, initially creating advertising and corporate communications media. Ten years later, Creative Atlantic  began to develop and produce television programming for the broadcast market, producing a range of television series' from scripted comedies to documentaries to children's programming and more.

Current and past productions
 The 902
 Robson Arms
 Liocracy
 Celtic Soul: The Life and Music of John Allan Cameron
 Ted Nolan: Behind the Bench
 As We Appear: The Story of Erica Rutherford
 Natalie MacMaster: Bringing The World Home
 The Singular Series
 Remedy Me
 King O' Fun
 The Mighty Jungle Pilot series
 Here I Am: The story of Denny Doherty and the Mamas and Papas

External links
 Official website

Television production companies of Canada